"I Am What I Am" is the third and final single to be released from Take That band member Mark Owen's debut solo album, Green Man. The single was released on 1 August 1997. The single peaked at number 29 on the UK Singles Chart, becoming his worst performing single from Green Man. "I Am What I Am" was originally intended to become the fourth single from the album, however due to ongoing battles between Owen and the label, became his final single on RCA Records before he was dropped.

Track listing
UK CD single #1
 "I Am What I Am" – 4:21
 "Mr. You" – 4:23
 "Johnny" – 3:12
 "Clementine" (remix) – 3:56

UK CD single #2
 "I Am What I Am" – 4:21
 "Is That What It's All About" (live) – 5:11
 "Secondhand Wonderland" (live) – 6:55
 "I Am What I Am" (remix) – 4:06

UK cassette
 "I Am What I Am" – 4:21
 "Johnny" – 3:12

Promotional single
 "I Am What I Am" – 4:06
 "I Am What I Am" (album version) – 4:21
 "Child" (radio edit) – 3:48
 "Clementine" (remix) – 3:56

Chart performance

References

1996 songs
1997 singles
Mark Owen songs
Songs written by Mark Owen
RCA Records singles